The Habbema dasyure (Murexia habbema) is a species of marsupial in the family Dasyuridae found in West Papua, Indonesia, and Papua New Guinea. Its natural habitat is rocky areas.

Some authorities place it in the separate genus Micromurexia.

References

Dasyuromorphs
Mammals of Papua New Guinea
Mammals of Western New Guinea
Mammals described in 1941
Taxonomy articles created by Polbot
Marsupials of New Guinea